Theresa Fu (born 22 September 1984) is a Hong Kong Cantopop singer, film and television actress, and model.

Fu was introduced by the Talent Bang model agency in order to become a pop star. She started her career in 2002 as one of the members of Cookies. The group disbanded in 2005.

In 2005, she recorded a duet, "自欺欺人", with Alex Fong. In 2006, she published a book with her personal drawings, stories and views on love. She is also good friends with her ex-bandmate, Stephy Tang.

In 2008, Fu performed at the S.U.C.C.E.S.S. charity gala in Vancouver, British Columbia, Canada, with many other artists.

On 30 May 2008, Fu appeared as a special guest on Leo Ku's The Magic Moments Concert in Toronto to a crowd of 10,000 people at Rogers Centre.

Fu's parents were immigrants from Fujian and her ancestral origin is in Xianyou.

Discography

Cookies

Mini Cookies

Solo

Appearances in other albums

Filmography

Films

TV series

Books
Tian Mimi (January, 2007)
T With Sunshine (July, 2007)
Life is Beautiful (2007) -- Postcard book
我會快樂的(July 2009)
Life is like a Ferris Wheel (July 2012)

See also
Cookies (group)

References

External links

TheresaFu.com
Theresafu.com T's Family BBS
Gold Label Typhoon official profile

1984 births
Cantonese-language singers
Cantopop singers
Cookies (group) members
Hong Kong film actresses
Hong Kong female models
Hong Kong television actresses
Living people
21st-century Hong Kong women singers
Hong Kong idols